The 2021 NXT TakeOver: In Your House was the 35th NXT TakeOver, the 29th In Your House, and the second annual NXT In Your House professional wrestling pay-per-view and livestreaming event produced by WWE. It was held exclusively for wrestlers from the promotion's NXT brand division. The event took place on June 13, 2021, from the Capitol Wrestling Center, hosted at the WWE Performance Center in Orlando, Florida. It was the first In Your House to air on the livestreaming service Peacock, as well as the first to air on traditional PPV since St. Valentine's Day Massacre: In Your House that aired in February 1999; the previous TakeOver: In Your House only aired on the WWE Network. The TakeOver series was discontinued with NXT's rebranding to NXT 2.0 in September 2021, but In Your House continued on as NXT's annual June event. This was also the last In Your House event to air on PPV, as NXT's major events as of the 2022 calendar year no longer air on PPV.

Six matches were contested at the event including one dark match. In the main event, Karrion Kross defeated Kyle O'Reilly, Adam Cole, Johnny Gargano, and Pete Dunne in a fatal five-way match by technical submission to retain the NXT Championship. In the penultimate match, Raquel González defeated Ember Moon to retain the NXT Women's Championship. Other prominent matches included LA Knight defeating Cameron Grimes in a ladder match for the vacant Million Dollar Championship and in the opening bout, NXT North American Champion Bronson Reed and NXT Tag Team Champions MSK (Nash Carter and Wes Lee) defeated Legado del Fantasma (Santos Escobar, Joaquin Wilde, and Raúl Mendoza) in a Winner Takes All Six-man Tag Team match to retain both of their respective championships.

Production

Background
TakeOver was a series of professional wrestling shows that began in May 2014, as WWE's NXT brand held their second WWE Network-exclusive event, billed as TakeOver. In subsequent months, the "TakeOver" moniker became the brand used by WWE for all of their NXT live specials. While originally exclusive to the WWE Network, NXT TakeOver events also became available on traditional pay-per-view beginning with TakeOver 31 in October 2020, and then also on Peacock after the American version of the WWE Network merged under Peacock in March 2021. The 2021 TakeOver: In Your House was scheduled to be held on June 13, 2021, as the 35th NXT TakeOver event, as well as the second in the TakeOver: In Your House chronology, a subseries of TakeOvers that carry the In Your House name.

In Your House was a series of monthly PPV shows that was held by the then-World Wrestling Federation (WWF, renamed to WWE in 2002) from May 1995 to February 1999. They aired when the promotion was not holding one of its then-five major PPVs (WrestleMania, King of the Ring, SummerSlam, Survivor Series, and Royal Rumble), and were sold at a lower cost. The branding was retired following February 1999's St. Valentine's Day Massacre: In Your House event, as the company moved to install permanent names for each of its monthly PPVs. In Your House was revived in 2020 as an NXT TakeOver event, thus the 2021 event was the 29th event to carry the In Your House name. It was also the first In Your House to air on traditional pay-per-view since the February 1999 event as well as the first In Your House to air on Peacock—the 2020 TakeOver: In Your House only aired on the WWE Network.

Impact of the COVID-19 pandemic

As a result of the COVID-19 pandemic that began affecting the industry in mid-March 2020, WWE had to present the majority of its programming from a behind closed doors set. NXT's programming was initially held at NXT's home base of Full Sail University in Winter Park, Florida. In October 2020, NXT's events were moved to the WWE Performance Center in Orlando, Florida, featuring the "Capitol Wrestling Center" setup, an homage to the Capitol Wrestling Corporation, the predecessor to WWE. Like the WWE ThunderDome utilized for Raw and SmackDown's programming, LED boards were placed around the Performance Center so that fans could attend virtually, while additionally, friends and family members of the wrestlers were in attendance along with a limited number of actual live fans divided from each other by plexiglass walls. 

For TakeOver: Stand & Deliver in April 2021, the plexiglass walls were removed, and live audience capacity was increased. In Your House increased capacity further to nearly 300 spectators, being the largest attended NXT event at the Capitol Wrestling Center. Nearly all COVID-19 protocols were lifted including physical distancing requirements and the requirement to wear masks although anyone who had tested positive, within the preceding 14 days, were asked to stay home. The virtual audience was also removed with the increased live audience capacity.

Storylines

The In Your House card included five matches. The storylines were produced on their weekly television program, NXT.

A triple threat match between Kyle O'Reilly, Pete Dunne, and Johnny Gargano was scheduled on the June 1 episode of NXT to determine who would face Karrion Kross for the NXT Championship at TakeOver: In Your House. The match ended in a no-contest after Adam Cole interfered and attacked all three competitors. Kross would confront Cole and made a request to NXT General Manager William Regal to defend the title against Cole, O'Reilly, Dunne, and Gargano. Regal agreed to Kross' request and made the bout a fatal five-way match for the title at the event.

González viciously assaulted Blackheart while Moon was forced to watch the ordeal after being subdued by Kai, following the conclusion of the women's tag team match between the team of Shotzi Blackheart and Ember Moon and the team of Dakota Kai and NXT Women's Champion Raquel González on the May 25 episode of NXT. The following week, Moon called out González and they both brawled in the ring. Later that same night, Moon announced that she would challenge González for the NXT Women's Championship at TakeOver: In Your House, which was made official.

On the May 25 episode of NXT, Mercedes Martinez defeated Zayda Ramier. Afterwards that day, the lights went out and turned back on with a red lighting, and Mei Ying of Tian Sha appeared on the LED screen. As things went back to normal Martinez was given a black symbol on the back of her wrist. The following week, Xia Li was with Boa watching a video of her first round loss against Martinez in the inaugural Mae Young Classic (four years ago) saying it was a disgrace to her family and she would hurt her at TakeOver: In Your House. Later that night, Martinez said that she was aware of Li being different, after facing her in the Mae Young Classic, and that she was not afraid of Li and would defeat her at TakeOver.

On the February 10 episode of NXT, Cameron Grimes made his return from injury and claimed to have become a GameStop investor during his time away (in reference to the GameStop stock rise), thus making him the "richest man in NXT". Grimes then began a feud with WWE Hall of Famer Ted DiBiase (The Million Dollar Man) after encountering him in a jewelry store over their watches. Over the next few weeks, DiBiase would continue to one-up Grimes, outbidding him in various purchases. On the May 25 episode of NXT, LA Knight confronted Grimes during the Million Dollar Face-Off segment between Grimes and DiBiase, the latter of whom Knight defended and allied with. The following week, it was announced that a singles match between Grimes and Knight was scheduled for TakeOver: In Your House. DiBiase later announced that their match would instead be a ladder match for the revived Million Dollar Championship.

On the June 1 episode of NXT, MSK (Nash Carter and Wes Lee) successfully defended their NXT Tag Team Championship against Legado Del Fantasma (Joaquin Wilde and Raúl Mendoza), after an assist from NXT North American Champion Bronson Reed, who took down Santos Escobar during the match. The following week, Escobar proposed a winner takes all match for the NXT North American Championship and NXT Tag Team Championships at TakeOver: In Your House, which Reed and MSK accepted.

Event

Preliminary matches
The pay-per-view opened with NXT North American Champion Bronson Reed and NXT Tag Team Champions MSK (Wes Lee and Nash Carter) facing off against Legado del Fantasma (Santos Escobar, Joaquin Wilde, and Raul Mendoza) in a Winner Takes All Six-man Tag Team match. During the match, Wilde and Mendoza performed a High-Low on Lee for a nearfall, before Carter broke it up. Escobar performed a Michinoku Driver on Reed for a nearfall. In the climax, after Reed tackled Escobar against one of the plexiglass walls, MSK performed their elevated corkscrew blockbuster on Mendoza, followed by Reed performing the "Tsunami" on Mendoza to retain their respective championships.

Next, Xia Li (accompanied by Boa) faced Mercedes Martinez. In the end, Li performed a roundhouse kick to Martinez's head to win the match. Following the pinfall, Martinez attacked both Li and Boa with a steel chair sending them out of the ring. As the duo retreated up the entrance ramp, Mei Ying, who watched and walked on stage, took Martinez down. As Martinez attempted to attack Ying, Ying applied a choke hold to immobilize Martinez, throwing her off the ramp into a guardrail.

In a backstage segment, Johnny Gargano and Kyle O'Reilly, two of the five participants in the main event match, were shown brawling in the arena parking lot.

After that, LA Knight faced Cameron Grimes in a ladder match for the Million Dollar Championship. Ted DiBiase watched the match at ringside — this was a back-and-forth match. During the match, Grimes retrieved the gold-plated ladder that DiBiase had used to introduce the match (which was on the stage). As Grimes ascended the ladder, Knight prevented Grimes from retrieving the Championship by tipping the ladder over. In the closing moments, Grimes attempted to ascend the ladder again, only for Knight to send Grimes off the ladder, through another ladder which was positioned outside the ring. Knight then ascended and retrieved the championship to win the match. Following the match, DiBiase awarded the championship to Knight.

In the fourth match, Raquel Gonzalez (accompanied by Dakota Kai) defended the NXT Women's Championship against Ember Moon. During the match, Moon performed her "Eclipse" on Gonzalez, for only Kai to place Gonzalez's foot on the bottom rope to void the pin. This prompted Moon's tag team partner Shotzi Blackheart, who was not seen on NXT due to injury, to come out and brawl with Kai to the backstage area. Gonzalez then performed the "Chingona Bomb" on Moon to retain the championship. Later, Kai and Blackheart were shown still brawling in the backstage area.

Main event
In the main event, Karrion Kross (accompanied by Scarlett) defended the NXT Championship against Johnny Gargano, Pete Dunne, Kyle O'Reilly, and Adam Cole in a fatal five-way match. During the match, Dunne, Gargano, O'Reilly, and Cole attempted to take out Kross, however Kross dispatched all the challengers. Dunne and Gargano threw Kross into the house door of the In Your House set at the top of the stage, temporarily taking Kross out. Kross later returned, however O'Reilly and Cole performed a powerbomb on Kross onto the announcer's table, which did not break. Dunne performed the "Bitter End" on Kross for a nearfall, Gargano performed a "One Final Beat" on Dunne, and Cole performed a "Panama City Sunrise" on Gargano. In the closing moments, O'Reilly performed a top-rope knee drop on Kross, but Cole broke up the pin with a "Superkick". Cole then performed a "Superkick" on Dunne before performing another on Gargano. Cole attempted the Last Shot, but O'Reilly avoided it and applied the "Heel Hook". Moments later, Kross recovered and applied the "Kross Jacket" on O'Reilly, who passed out, to retain the title.

Following the match, NXT general manager William Regal, who looked sullen, told an interviewer that in view of the wild brawls, he was unable to keep order in NXT anymore and mused that it was time for a change.

Reception
TakeOver: In Your House generally received positive reviews from critics. Wrestling journalist Dave Meltzer awarded 4 stars to the six-man tag team match, 2.25 stars to the Xia Li/Mercedes Martinez match, 3.75 stars to the ladder match, 3 stars to the women's championship match, and 4.25 stars to the main event. The event as a whole received a 7.5 "Good" rating from 411mania's Kevin Pantoja. Fightful.com's Sean Ross Sapp gave each match generally positive ratings as well, with the main event receiving the highest score at 8.5/10 and the Li/Martinez match the lowest at 5.75/10.

Aftermath
William Regal opened the June 15 episode of NXT by talking about his history with the brand, tearfully recounting the many roles he had had with NXT since 2014. As he was about to reach a conclusion, he was interrupted by NXT Champion Karrion Kross, who gloated about his victory at TakeOver and mockingly inviting Regal to leave. Samoa Joe then made his return to NXT (and to WWE as a whole, having been released from his contract two months prior). Regal revealed that he planned to make Joe the new general manager of NXT, and then formally extended the offer. Joe declined, but made a counteroffer to become Regal's enforcer if Regal stayed in the role. Regal said he would accept on two conditions — that Joe would not be an active in-ring competitor and that he could not physically engage anyone unless provoked. Joe agreed, and began filling the role in segments throughout that night. At the end of the show, he and Regal shook hands on a successful night one of their partnership, with Joe stating it would be "night one of many."

During TakeOver, The Great American Bash was scheduled for July 6 as a special episode of NXT. During the June 15 episode of NXT, continuing on from their encounter at TakeOver, as well as their past feud, Kyle O'Reilly and Adam Cole were signed for a match at The Great American Bash.

Also during the following episode of NXT, LA Knight was formally presented with the Million Dollar Championship by Ted DiBiase. After an emotional promo where he thanked DiBiase for being a fixture of his childhood and called receiving the championship from him the honor of his career, Knight turned on and attacked DiBiase (who was saved by Cameron Grimes) in a video uploaded to WWE's YouTube channel, it was shown that Grimes had apologized to DiBiase following the match at TakeOver.

The Santos Escobar-Bronson Reed and Xia Li-Mercedes Martinez feuds both continued in promos, with Escobar promising to face Reed for the NXT North American Championship one-on-one in the future.

In September 2021, NXT was rebranded as NXT 2.0, returning the brand to its original function as WWE's developmental territory. The NXT TakeOver series was subsequently discontinued, but In Your House continued on as NXT's annual June event. This was also the last In Your House event to air on PPV, as beginning with the 2022 calendar year, NXT's major events no longer air on PPV, just livestreaming.

Results

References

External links
 

2021 WWE Network events
In Your House
In Your House
2021 in professional wrestling in Florida
Events in Florida
Professional wrestling in Orlando, Florida
June 2021 events in the United States
Events in Orlando, Florida